Taonius pavo is a species of glass squid found in the Atlantic Ocean. Its exact geographic distribution is uncertain, but it may extend to the southwestern Indian Ocean through the Agulhas Current.

They are eaten by the sperm whale in Southeast Asia, southern Australian, Hawaiian, and North Atlantic waters.

See also
Teuthowenia megalops

References

External links

Squid
Cephalopods described in 1821